Smyrniopsis is a genus of flowering plants belonging to the family Apiaceae.

Its native range is Eastern Mediterranean to Iran.

Species
Species:

Smyrniopsis aucheri 
Smyrniopsis syriaca

References

Apioideae